Sandersville is a town in Jones County, Mississippi, United States. The population was 636 at the 2020 census, down from 731 at the 2010 census. It is part of the Laurel micropolitan area.

History
Scottish settlers migrated here during the 1820s and built the Good Hope Presbyterian Church. In 1855, the town was named after the Sanders, a pioneer family.

Home construction was influenced by the Victorian era, as there are a noticeable number of cupolas on buildings in the town.

Hunt Refining Company has a refinery northeast of Sandersville which processes crude oil acquired primarily from local Mississippi fields. The refinery produces distillate feedstock, paving grade asphalt, heavy gas oils, naptha, and roofing grade asphalt.

Geography
Sandersville is located in northeastern Jones County at  (31.785455, -89.034572). U.S. Route 11 (Front Street) passes through the center of town, leading southwest  to Laurel, the county's largest city, and northeast  to Stafford Springs. Interstate 59 passes just west of the town limits, with access from Exit 104 (West Main Street). I-59 leads northeast  to Meridian and southwest  to Hattiesburg.

Demographics

As of the 2020 United States census, there were 636 people, 268 households, and 218 families residing in the town.

As of the census of 2000, there were 789 people, 317 households, and 231 families residing in the town. The population density was 159.2 people per square mile (61.4/km). There were 350 housing units at an average density of 70.6 per square mile (27.2/km). The racial makeup of the town was 92.14% White, 6.84% African American, 0.89% Native American, and 0.13% from two or more races. Hispanic or Latino of any race were 0.13% of the population.

There were 317 households, out of which 31.9% had children under the age of 18 living with them, 56.8% were married couples living together, 12.9% had a female householder with no husband present, and 27.1% were non-families. 23.3% of all households were made up of individuals, and 13.6% had someone living alone who was 65 years of age or older. The average household size was 2.49 and the average family size was 2.94.

In the town, the population was spread out, with 23.2% under the age of 18, 9.8% from 18 to 24, 28.1% from 25 to 44, 22.2% from 45 to 64, and 16.7% who were 65 years of age or older. The median age was 39 years. For every 100 females, there were 92.9 males. For every 100 females age 18 and over, there were 84.8 males.

The median income for a household in the town was $26,538, and the median income for a family was $34,167. Males had a median income of $27,614 versus $20,313 for females. The per capita income for the town was $14,429. About 12.8% of families and 16.2% of the population were below the poverty line, including 18.3% of those under age 18 and 28.9% of those age 65 or over.

Education
Sandersville is served by the Jones County School District.

Notable people
 Doug Satcher, former National Football League linebacker
 Shad White, State Auditor of Mississippi

References

Towns in Jones County, Mississippi
Towns in Mississippi
Towns in Laurel micropolitan area